Ruah may refer to:

 Daniela Ruah (born 1983), Portuguese-American actress from the NCIS Los Angeles TV series
 Maurice Ruah (born 1971), Venezuelan tennis player
 Rûaħ or ruach, a Hebrew word meaning ‘breath, spirit’

See also
 T'ruah, a non-profit organization of Rabbis for Human Rights